Chaka Town is a rural town in Ulan County, Qinghai, China.  it had a population of 2,100 and an area of .  The Han, Hui, Mongolian and Tibetan live here.

History
After the establishment of the Communist State, it was renamed Chaka Commune in 1959. 

It was upgraded to a town in 1985.

On October 14, 2016, it was listed among the first group of "Small towns with Chinese characteristics" by the State Council of China.

Geography

The Chaka Salt Lake located within the town.

Economy
Beef and mutton are important to the economy.

Transportation
The G6 Beijing–Lhasa Expressway passes across the town east to west.

The Chaka railway station serves the town. Chaka railway is a branch line of Qinghai–Tibet railway.

Culture
The area was used for location filming of the 2018 romantic comedy film Love in Chaka.

Gallery

References

Divisions of Ulan County
Township-level divisions of Qinghai